Charkose Jhadi (or in Nepali, चार कोशे झाडी) is the largest and the most dense forest in Nepal. Located just a few miles south of Dharan, the forest is visible for 10 miles when heading north toward Dharan from Nepal's longest highway, Mahendra, the east-west highway that spans the country from the far east to the far west. 
Charkose Jhadi is present in the current Province 01 of Nepal. It is at coordinates 26°43'42"N   87°22'45"E, and has a total area of 80.31 km. 

Lying in the Mid-Hill terai region where there is an increase in the urban areas and dun valleys contributing for ultimate population growth has threatened this region. However, no exact study has been made about this particular region of the nation. These facts ultimately suggest the urgent need and demand of study of the ecological and geographical study of the state of this region. It is widely rumored that this forest gives homage to the wild animals like python, fox, giant tortoise and so on. However, no proof has been brought forward for proving these rumors to be true.

References 

Geography of Madhesh Province